Ayyam Pudhur village, Nagadevam Palayam post, is a small village of less than 150 inhabitants, situated in the Gobi taluk, Erode district in Tamil Nadu. 
The nearest big village is Vellan Kovil.

Geography
Ayyam pudhur has an average elevation of 330 metres (1082 feet).

Transportation
Ayyam pudhur can be reached by bus from Gobi town (Bus No: 10A,10B). Ayyam pudhur is 10 kilometers from Gobi and 20 kilometers from the Perundurai town (Bus No: P4).

Demographics
As of the 2001 Indian census, Ayyam pudhur had a population of 125. Males constitute 51% of the population and females 49%. Ayyam pudhur has an average literacy rate of 60%, higher than the national average of 59.5%; with male literacy at 83% and female literacy at 67%. 10% of the population is under 6 years of age.

Climate
The climate in general is dry and characterised by scant rainfall. The maximum rainfall is recorded in Gobichettipalayam and Gobi, Tamil Nadu Taluk. Unlike the nearby Coimbatore district which is blessed with a healthy climate, Ayyam pudhur village has dry weather throughout the year except during the monsoons. The Palghat Gap in the Western Ghats, which has a moderating effect on the climate of Coimbatore district, does not render much help in bringing down the dry climate in this area. The cool moist wind that gushes out of the west coast through Palghat gap, loses its coolness and becomes dry by the time it crosses Coimbatore district and reaches Ayyam pudhur.

Generally the first two months of the year are pleasant, but in March the temperature begins to rise, which persists till the end of May. The highest temperatures are normally recorded during May. The showers during this period do not provide much relief from the oppressive heat; however there is a slight improvement in the climate during the June–August period. During the pre-monsoon period, the temperature reverses its trend. By September the sky gets heavily overcast, although the rains are meagre. The northeast monsoon sets in vigorously only during October–November, and by December the rains disappear, rendering the climate clear but pleasant.

Economy
Agriculture is the primary occupation, with coconuts, rice, turmeric and sugarcane being the main crops, which are marketed here in bulk. These products are exported to other states and countries.

Ayyam pudhur is well known for handloom, and powerloom textile products and ready made garments.

Fairs and festivals
There are one old temples dedicated to Maari amman at Ayyam pudhur.

Media and communication

Telecommunications
Ayyam Pudhur has good a communications infrastructure, with all major service providers present in the area. Services available are DOT landline, CDMA and GSM. Fiber-optic cables were laid in 2001, improving internet access, which had begun with the establishment of a dial-up and broadband connection in 1996.

Educational institutions
The village has one Government Elementary School and a Govt Higher Secondary School.

Gobi Taluk
Villages in Erode district